Drüsensee is a lake in Kreis Herzogtum Lauenburg, Schleswig-Holstein, Germany. At an elevation of 14 m, its surface area is 73 ha.

Lakes of Schleswig-Holstein
LDrusensee